The 2008 Japan Super Series is the seventh tournament of the 2008 BWF Super Series in badminton. It was held in Tokyo, Japan, from September 16 to September 21, 2008.

Final Results

External links
Yonex Japan Super Series 2008 at tournamentsoftware.com

Japan Open
Japan Open (badminton)
Sports competitions in Tokyo
Japan